The Porta Asinaria is a gate in the Aurelian Walls of Rome. Dominated by two protruding tower blocks and associated guard rooms, it was built between 271 and 275 AD, at the same time as the Wall itself. It was not rebuilt or fortified in the time of Honorius and not restored by Theoderic as most of the other gates.

It is through this gate that East Roman troops under General Belisarius entered the city in 536, reclaiming the city for the Byzantine Empire from the Ostrogoths.

By the 16th century it had become overwhelmed by traffic. A new breach in the walls was made nearby to create the Porta San Giovanni. At this point, the Porta Asinaria was closed to traffic.

See also

List of ancient monuments in Rome

Notes

References

Further reading
 Mauro Quercioli, Le mura e le porte di Roma. Newton Compton Ed., Rome, 1982
 Laura G. Cozzi, Le porte di Roma. F.Spinosi Ed., Rome, 1968

External links
 Porta Asinaria, Roma Segreta 

Asinaria